Philippe Swan (born Philippe Colpaert on 18 March 1961 in Elisabethville, Democratic Republic of the Congo) is a Belgian singer-songwriter. He had a hit in 1989 with "Dans ma rue".

He is now practising painting under the artist name Le Closier, in a style close to pop art and urban art. He lives and works in the United States.

Biography
After his studies in Solvay, he worked in a Belgian record company. Then he wrote a few songs, including "J'ai joué, j'ai perdu", "Suzy", "Policy of Love", "Je plane", "Machinalement" and "Rien faire sauf l'amour". "Dans ma rue" was released in France in 1989 and reached No. 36 on the French SNEP Singles Chart. However, he preferred to write and compose for other artists, released a few albums under his own name, then became a producer. His most notable client was Mélanie Cohl, who performed a song from the soundtrack of the Walt Disney movie Mulan. He also wrote "Dis oui", the song she entered in the Eurovision Song Contest 1998, as well as lyrics for Günther Neefs (2000), Priscilla (2002), Lutin Plop, and Fred & Samson (2007).

References

External links 
 website

1961 births
Living people
Belgian male singers
Belgian pop singers
Belgian singer-songwriters
French-language singers of Belgium